Daily Telegraph and North Murchison and Pilbarra Gazette, also published as Meekatharra Miner and Daily Telegraph and North Murchison Gazette, was a weekly English language newspaper published in Meekatharra, Western Australia. It was distributed to Meekathara, Nannine, Cue, Geraldton, and the Murchison and Pilbara regions.

History 
Meekatharra Miner was published from 7 August 1909 to 6 July 1918, by Daniel James Colgan. It was continued by the Daily Telegraph and North Murchison Gazette, which ran from 8 July 1918 to 18 March 1920. It was printed and published for the Telegraph Printing and Publishing Co. Ltd, by Stephen Thorne Upham.

A daily one page supplement was published between 2 January 1920 and 24 September 1921.

In the last issue of the Daily Telegraph and North Murchison and Pilbarra Gazette there was a small public notice advising readers that the newspaper would be discontinued from that date, citing the reason for the closure as a shortage of staff and the inability to purchase spare parts.

Availability 
Issues of the Meekatharra Miner (1909-1918), the Daily Telegraph and North Murchison Gazette (1918-1920), and the Daily Telegraph and North Murchison and Pilbarra Gazette (1920-1947) have been digitised as part of the Australian Newspapers Digitisation Program, a project of the National Library of Australia in cooperation with the State Library of Western Australia.

A daily supplement was published between 2 January 1920 and 24 September 1921.

Hard copy and microfilm copies of the Meekatharra Miner, the Daily Telegraph and North Murchison Gazette, and the Daily Telegraph and North Murchison and Pilbarra Gazette are also available at the State Library of Western Australia.

See also 
 List of newspapers in Australia
 List of newspapers in Western Australia
 Pilbara newspapers

References

External links 
Available at Trove:
 
 
 

1909 establishments in Australia
1947 disestablishments in Australia
Publications established in 1909
Publications disestablished in 1947
Defunct newspapers published in Western Australia
Newspapers on Trove
Newspapers of the Mid West region of Western Australia